|}

The Grand Prix de Vichy-Auvergne is a Group 3 flat horse race in France open to thoroughbreds aged three years or older. It is run at Vichy over a distance of 2,000 metres (about 1¼ miles), and it is scheduled to take place each year in July.

History
The event was established in 1875, and it was originally called the Grand Prix de Vichy. It was run as a handicap until 1899, and during this period its distance was frequently modified. For several years thereafter it was titled the Grand Prix International du Cercle de Vichy. It was abandoned in 1907, and became known as the Grand Prix de la Ville de Vichy the following year.

The title was appended with "et de la Société de Sport de France" in 1958. The Société de Sport de France owned the racecourse, and later merged with similar organisations to form France Galop.

The event reverted to its original name in 1965, and was run as a handicap in 1970. It was given Group 3 status in 1976.

The name of the region where Vichy is located, Auvergne, was added to the title in 2005.

The race has been contested over various distances, with spells over 2,600 metres (1900–41, 1943–64, 1966–75), 2,400 metres (1976–91) and 2,000 metres (1992–present).

Records
Most successful horse (2 wins):
 Shikani – 1960, 1961
 Perouges – 1979, 1980
 Marildo – 1993, 1995
 Touch of Land – 2005, 2006

Leading jockey (5 wins):
 Christophe Soumillon – Kerrygold (2000), Vangelis (2003), Bailador (2004), Daly Daly (2009), Saga Dream (2013)

Leading trainer (4 wins):
 James Cunnington – Marichette (1881), Dacis (1891), Machiavel (1898), Kerlaz (1900)
 Robert Denman – Gouvernant (1904), Marsa (1910), Checkmate (1923), Alguazil (1926, dead-heat)
 Antoine Lassard – Yakoba (1934), Ortolan (1935), Champittet (1941), Clodoche (1943)

Leading owner (7 wins):
 Marcel Boussac – Grillemont (1924, dead-heat), Alguazil (1926, dead-heat), Thaouka (1932), Dadji (1937), Coaraze (1947), Amphis (1952), Shaker (1954)

Winners since 1979

Earlier winners

 1875: Damoiseau
 1876: Mondaine
 1877: Giboulee
 1878: Le Marquis
 1879: Gift
 1880:
 1881: Marichette
 1882–85: no race
 1886: Prytanee
 1887: Ary
 1888: Bocage
 1889: Etretat
 1890: Belle Dame
 1891: Dacis
 1892: Le Cordouan
 1893:
 1894: Lanterne Magique
 1895: Feuillet
 1896:
 1897:
 1898: Machiavel
 1899:
 1900: Kerlaz
 1901: Lady Killer
 1902: Red Cedar
 1903: Alpha
 1904: Gouvernant
 1905: Rataplan
 1906: Eider
 1907: no race
 1908: Roi Herode
 1909: Chulo
 1910: Marsa
 1911: Dor
 1912: Predicateur
 1913: Tripolette
 1914–19: no race
 1920: Astypalee
 1921: Herlies
 1922: Harpocrate
 1923: Checkmate
 1924: Grillemont / Seclin 1
 1925: Momus
 1926: Alguazil / Javelot 1
 1927: Juveilin
 1928: Rovigo
 1929: Frolic 2
 1930: Guernanville
 1931: Hetre Pourpre
 1932: Thaouka
 1933: Casterari
 1934: Yakoba
 1935: Ortolan
 1936: Vatellor
 1937: Dadji
 1938: Eclair au Chocolat
 1939: Transtevere
 1940: no race
 1941: Champittet
 1942: Tambourin
 1943: Clodoche
 1944: no race
 1945: Achille
 1946:
 1947: Coaraze
 1948: Pegase
 1949: Astragram
 1950: Monticola
 1951: Ombrette
 1952: Amphis
 1953: Romantisme
 1954: Shaker
 1955: Bewitched
 1956: Cambremer
 1957: Jockero
 1958: Makalu
 1959: Wolfram
 1960: Shikani
 1961: Shikani
 1962: Karol
 1963: Signora
 1964: Amertume
 1965: Carvin
 1966: Cantilius
 1967: Dan Kano
 1968: Crozier
 1969: Manitoba
 1970:
 1971:
 1972: Royal Land
 1973: Sophora
 1974: Authi
 1975: Ambrellita
 1976: Diagramatic
 1977: Guadanini
 1978: Tempus Fugit

1 The 1924 and 1926 races were dead-heats and have joint winners.2 Le Chatelet finished first in 1929, but he was disqualified for obstruction.

See also
 List of French flat horse races
 Recurring sporting events established in 1875 – this race is included under its original title, Grand Prix de Vichy.

References
 France Galop / Racing Post:
                                                                                                 * france-galop.com – A Brief History: Grand Prix de Vichy-Auvergne.
 galop.courses-france.com – Grand Prix de Vichy-Auvergne – Palmarès depuis 1980.
 galopp-sieger.de – Grand Prix de Vichy.
 horseracingintfed.com – International Federation of Horseracing Authorities – Grand Prix de Vichy-Auvergne (2016).
 pedigreequery.com – Grand Prix de Vichy – Vichy.

Open middle distance horse races
Horse races in France